Höljesbanan, also known as Höljes Motorstadion, is a rallycross circuit situated in the village of Höljes, in the Finnskogen ('Finnwoods') of the Swedish county Värmland, beside the river Klarälven and close to the Norwegian border. The circuit opened in February 1976 and is one of the most famous rallycross circuits in the world. Traditionally held over the first weekend of July the venue plays host to the so-called 'Magic Weekend' of rallycross when it runs the Swedish round of the European and World Rallycross championships.

History

The circuit was originally part of a go-kart centre opened in 1972 by the Finnskoga Motorklubb following the influx of Swedish drivers into Formula One, but quickly fell into disuse and it was decided the nearby gravel pit was to be turned into a rallycross circuit in October 1974. On February 1, 1976, the circuit held its first event in front of 3,500 people on a bitterly cold winters' day, and was won by Per Eklund.

The circuit was successful locally and the Finnskoga Masters was created as a marquee event for Scandinavian drivers. The circuit saw very little national action as the Swedish ASN were not on good terms with the Finnskoga Motorklubb, and despite having a suitable venue the Svenska Bilsportförbundet (SBF) did not straight away recommend the circuits' addition to the FIA European Rallycross Championship due to the conflict. However, the circuit did eventually make its international debut for the Swedish round of the 1991 European Rallycross Championship. The event was held on July 7 in front of 15,000 people and quickly gained approval from drivers and fans alike. The Swedish round rotated through various circuits in the 1990s but the Höljesbanan became a permanent fixture in 1999 and is now a marquee event within it and the newly formed World Championship.

Event history

European rallycross

World rallycross

Notes

References

External links

Motorsport venues in Sweden
World Rallycross circuits